The Phimai Historical Park is one of the largest Khom temples in Thailand. It is located in the town of Phimai, Nakhon Ratchasima province. It is one of the most important tourist attractions in Nakhon Ratchasima province.

Phimai had previously been an important town at the time of the Khom Empire. The temple Prasat Hin Phimai, located in the center of the town, was one of the major Khom temples in ancient Thailand, connected with Angkor by an ancient Khmer Highway, and oriented to face Angkor as its cardinal direction. The site is now protected as the Phimai Historical Park.

History 

The temple marks one end of the Ancient Khom Highway from Angkor. As the enclosed area of 1020x580m is comparable with that of Angkor Wat, it is suggested to have been an important city in the Khom Empire. Most buildings are from the late 11th to the late 12th century, built in the Baphuon, Bayon and Khom temple style. However, even though the Khom at that time were Hindu, the temple was built as a Buddhist temple, since the inhabitants of the Khorat area had been Buddhists as far back as the 7th century. Inscriptions name the site Vimayapura (which means city of Vimaya), which developed into the Thai name Phimai.

In the aftermath of the fall of the Ayutthaya Kingdom in 1767, attempts were made to set up five separate states, with  Prince Teppipit, a son of King Borommakot, attempting to establish Phimai as one, ruling over eastern provinces including Nakhon Ratchasima. As the weakest of the five, Prince Teppipit was the first to be defeated and was executed in 1768.

The first inventory of the ruins was done in 1901 by the French geographer Etienne Aymonier. The site was put under Thai governmental protection by announcement in the Government Gazette, Volume 53, section 34, on September 27, 1936. Most of the restorations were done from 1964 to 1969 as a joint Thai-French project. The historical park, now managed by the Fine Arts Department, was officially opened by Princess Maha Chakri Sirindhorn on April 12, 1989.

Phimai has recently been the base of operations for the excavation of Ban Non Wat.

Khom influence 
As the northeastern part of Thailand was part of the Khom Empire (once ruled by the Khom, modern day Cambodia), Phimai's architecture and cultural decorations were built in Khom architecture. Art and architecture shown on the temple itself shows great evidence of the ancient Khom civilization. Similar in its look and design to Angkor, it also has the same function for worshiping the gods in the Hindu religion.

Despite the fact that Phimai was built in a similar fashion to Angkor and other Khom Buddhist temples, the religious origin of some structures within Phimai's walls are still debated. Evidence of Dvaravati influence, such as the sculpture of "the Wheel of Law" or the statue of Buddha, shows that Phimai was an important Buddhist spiritual location. Although a large quantity of Buddhist artwork has been uncovered in Phimai, evidence including the large pots that were embedded in some corners of the structure suggest that spiritual practices other than Buddhism were also practiced in Phimai. Phimai thus has been an important religious landmark for Animists, Buddhists, and Hindus.

The earliest engraved records of the Khmer is dated from the 6th century AD in the northeast of Thailand. For example, stone Sanskrit inscriptions were found along with statues and engraved images of Hindu deities, such as the image of Shiva's bull Nandin. The king during that time, Mahendravarman, ordered his men to obliterate the engraved inscription. Modern scholars debate about the possibility that evidence may have been lost.

Phimai, along with other Khom temples in Thailand, were built mainly under the cause of the "Deveraja cult," or "the King that resembles a god." Jayavarman II was the most mentioned "devaraja." The Devaraja cult developed the belief of worshiping Shiva and the principle that the king was an avatar of Shiva. Under this principle, Khom rulers built temples to glorify the reign of the king along with the spread of Hinduism.
 
The 10th century was the time of the reign of king Rajendravarman II (944-968 AD), which was also a time when Khom control was spreading into what is now northeastern Thailand. Consequently, temples in Thailand with the Kleang and Baphuon styles remain as evidence of this Khom heritage. These structures shared the same signature of having three brick towers on a single platform, for instance the Prasat Prang Ku in Si Saket province and Ban Phuluang in Surin province.

Each individual building has its own special features or functions. For example, Prang Brahmadat was built of laterite blocks that form a square. Or Prang Hin Daeng which translates to "Red Stone Tower" which is also a square but was made of red sandstone.  Or the main sanctuary built of white sandstone that is almost 32 meters long.  The southern lintel has a statue of Buddha meditating with "seven hoods of naga Muchalinda." Adjacent to this is a collection of statues of devils and animals depicted from the Tantric Mahayana Buddhist scripture.

Today Phimai is a well-known tourist attraction, especially among people interested in history and archaeology. Located in the middle of Phimai is a small rectangular gallery surrounding the courtyard, which has been newly rebuilt. Within the gallery there is a pre-Angkorian Buddhist inscription that tells the story of prince Siddhartha Gautama and his journey to becoming Buddha, along with other classic Buddhist stories. The prang symbolize that the area is a sacred space.

Within Phimai’s wall

When tourists enter the area of Phimai from the old town on the south, they have to cross a river about one kilometer to the south and enter an ancient laterite landing stage which archaeologists believe stood for the bathing place for the heroine in local myths. The south gate is the city main gate, also known as the "Pratu Chai," which has recently been reconstructed by the Royal Fine Arts Department. Its size is enormous; it is said that the size is big enough for a royal elephant to enter. The Royal Fine Arts Department also built an inner gallery which shows ancient Buddhist inscriptions and small sculptures as well as pieces of wrecked architecture. The rest of Phimai remains the same only with a little restoration by the Royal Arts Department.

Architecture style

Having a lot in common with Angkor Wat, Phimai is an example of classical Khom architecture. Ancient Khom architects were best known for their superior use of sandstone over the traditional bricks and laterite architectures. Sandstone is used on the visible outer layer. Laterite on the other hand was used for the inner wall and other hidden parts. All the structures are huge sandstone blocks. There are many lotus-shaped roofs representing Mount Meru (Hinduism's holy mountain).

Khom temples in general, as well as Phimai in this case, were intended to resemble the universe. The main building resembles the peak of Mount Meru at the center of the universe. The surrounding walls resemble the water and encircling mountains. The Khmer did not develop the technique of true vault architecture during their time, results in large areas at Phimai that could not be roofed over. They instead developed the use of multiple chapels separated by open-air spaces.

Construction materials
The Khom learned how to use bricks, sandstone, and laterite effectively.  They were the three principal structural materials.  Builders generally cut the lintel at 45 degrees to produce a triangular wedge.

Archaeological projects 
In 1998, the Origins of Angkor Project (OAP), a joint project of the Royal Thai Fine Arts Department, Anthropology Department, and the University of Otago, New Zealand, began excavations to investigate the underlying sequence. Temple construction during the Angkorian period involved the deliberate deposition of layers of fill, which can clearly be seen in the stratigraphy of the site.

Gallery

References

Bibliography
Michael Freeman - A guide to Khmer temples in Thailand and Laos,

External links

- Computer model of the temple
"Phimai Historical Park detailed description with pictures and video" from "Thai-Thaifood"
"Phimai Historical Park" in Korat Magazine

Historical parks of Thailand
Archaeological sites in Thailand
Isan
Angkorian sites in Thailand
Tourist attractions in Nakhon Ratchasima province
Buildings and structures in Nakhon Ratchasima province
1989 establishments in Thailand